Cabin Fever is the ninth mixtape by American rapper Wiz Khalifa. It was released on February 17, 2011. The mixtape features guest appearances from Trae Tha Truth, Nikkiya, MDMA, Big Sean, Juicy J and Chevy Woods.

Reception

Critical response
Sputnik Music gave Cabin Fever a very positive review, awarding it 4 out of 5 stars. Reviewer Jeremy Lin commented that the mixtape "mixes both his old and new style for a perfect balance" and called it better than Wiz's studio album "Rolling Papers". Gabriel Kramer of Live Music Guide praised the tracks "Phone Numbers," "Gangbang" and "Middle of You" and stated they "make the mixtape worth getting."

Commercial performance
The mixtape was widely successful and is the 15th most downloaded mixtape of all time on DatPiff as of February 2019 with over 1,562,050 downloads. It is certified Diamond on Datpiff.

Track listing

References

2011 mixtape albums
Wiz Khalifa albums
Albums produced by Sonny Digital
Albums produced by Drumma Boy
Albums produced by Lex Luger